Makarasankranti, or Makaravillaku, is a period that coincides with approximately 13–14 January, and is considered important for devotees of Lord Ayyappan.

During the season (late November to early January), Ayyappan devotees are able to visit Sabarimala every day. 

At the end of this period, on Makaravilakku day (usually 13 or 14 January), several events take place, in which an eagle guards the temple and the thiruvabaranam (Lord's jewels) by continually circling it for days on end, even amidst the congestion.

During the night there is not a star in the sky, apart from one star, the Makaranakshatram, which devotees believe is the abode of the gods in heaven awaiting the final ceremony at the Sabarimala temple. After the Lord's jewels have been placed on the idol, the eagle flies away, the single star in the sky disappears, and an intense white light (Makarajyoti) is seen on the hillside of Sabarimala in the distance, which devotees believe to be the Lord himself appearing. Thousands each year come to Sabarimala to witness the event.

There have been no scientific studies attempting to validate this phenomenon.

See also
Ayyappan
Hinduism
Hindu festivals
Religious festivals in India